Chancellor is an unincorporated community in Geneva County, Alabama, United States. Chancellor has a post office with ZIP code 36316.

References

Unincorporated communities in Geneva County, Alabama
Unincorporated communities in Alabama